Scharon Bluff is a steep rock bluff (1,000 m) on the south side of Tapsell Foreland, Victoria Land. The bluff surmounts the north side of Barnett Glacier, 9 nautical miles (17 km) west of Cape Moore. Mapped by United States Geological Survey (USGS) from surveys and U.S. Navy air photos, 1960–63. Named by Advisory Committee on Antarctic Names (US-ACAN) for LeRoy H. Scharon, U.S. Exchange Scientist (geophysics) at Molodezhnaya station, winter 1968.

Cliffs of Victoria Land
Pennell Coast